The Wuhan World Tennis Tour is a tournament for professional female tennis players played on outdoor hard courts. The event is classified as a $25,000 ITF Women's Circuit tournament and has been held in Wuhan, China, since 2014. The tournament was previously a $50,000 tournament from 2014 to 2016.

Past finals

Singles

Doubles

External links 
 Official website 
 ITF search

Wuhan
Hard court tennis tournaments
Tennis tournaments in China
Recurring sporting events established in 2014
Sport in Wuhan